Union Sportif Masséda is a Togolese football club based in Masséda. The club was founded in 1972. They play in the top division in Togolese football.

Performance in CAF competitions
CAF Confederation Cup: 1 appearance
2008 – First round of 16

Players 

 Tounde Adekounle
 Alex Kinvi-Boh

References

Football clubs in Togo